Joseph Dominic Curletta (born March 8, 1994) is an American former professional baseball first baseman.

Career

Los Angeles Dodgers
Curletta attended Mountain Pointe High School in Ahwatukee, Phoenix, Arizona. The Los Angeles Dodgers selected Curletta in the sixth round of the 2012 MLB draft, and he signed with the Dodgers rather than attend the University of Arizona.

Curletta began his professional career with the Arizona League Dodgers. He played for the Ogden Raptors in the Rookie-level Pioneer League in 2013 and the Great Lakes Loons of the Class A Midwest League in 2014.

Seattle Mariners
In September 2016, the Dodgers sent Curletta to the Philadelphia Phillies as the player to be named later in their earlier trade for Carlos Ruiz. After the 2016 season, the Phillies traded Curletta to the Mariners for Pat Venditte. He played for the Modesto Nuts of the Class A-Advanced California League in 2017. In 2018, he played for the Arkansas Travelers of the Class AA Texas League, and he won the Texas League Player of the Year Award. Curletta was awarded the Ken Griffey Jr. Minor League Hitter of the Year by the Seattle Mariners for his 2018 season.

The Mariners added him to their 40-man roster to protect him from the Rule 5 draft after the 2018 season. He began the 2019 season with the Tacoma Rainiers of the Class AAA Pacific Coast League.

Boston Red Sox
The Boston Red Sox claimed Curletta off of waivers on May 4, and assigned him to the Portland Sea Dogs of the Class AA Eastern League. On September 1, the Red Sox assigned Curletta outright to Portland, removing him from their 40-man roster.

Los Angeles Angels
In December 2019, Curletta signed a minor-league deal with the Los Angeles Angels. He was released in late May 2020.

References

External links

Living people
1994 births
People from Phoenix, Arizona
Baseball players from Arizona
Baseball first basemen
Arkansas Travelers players
Arizona League Dodgers players
Great Lakes Loons players
Modesto Nuts players
Ogden Raptors players
Portland Sea Dogs players
Rancho Cucamonga Quakes players
Tacoma Rainiers players
Tulsa Drillers players